Kinta River (Malay: Sungai Kinta) is a river in Perak, Malaysia. It gets its name from the Kinta Valley, which surrounds Ipoh, the capital of Perak. Ipoh sits along this river. There are many limestone hills in the area surrounding the river, and there used to be many tin mines. The supposedly largest tin field in the world was discovered in 1876 in the Kinta Valley. The river was also well known for its wide variety of freshwater fish. The fisheries department reported a greater abundance of fish from the Intake Dam to Tasek, and from a secluded fish pool,  down from Tanjung Rambutan. Fishing in this area used to be a major local activity until the fisheries gradually closed down.

Kinta River is one of the main branches of the Perak River.

Major settlements
Major settlements along the river are:

Sungai Siput
Ipoh
Pusing
Batu Gajah
Gopeng
Teronoh
Kampar
Tanjung Tualang

See also
Kinta Valley

References

Rivers of Perak
Rivers of Malaysia